Tanner Hummel (born August 16, 1996) is an American professional soccer player who last played as a defender for Orlando City B in USL League One.

References

External links 
 
 Tanner Hummel at Orlando City B
 Tanner Hummel at University of Kentucky

1996 births
Living people
People from Kennesaw, Georgia
Sportspeople from Cobb County, Georgia
Soccer players from Georgia (U.S. state)
American soccer players
Association football defenders
Kentucky Wildcats men's soccer players
Reading United A.C. players
Tormenta FC players
Houston FC players
Orlando City B players
USL League One players
USL League Two players